Shantae and the Seven Sirens is a platform game developed by WayForward. It is the fifth game in the Shantae series, following Shantae: Half-Genie Hero. The game was released via Apple Arcade for iOS in September 2019 and macOS in October 2019, with Nintendo Switch, PlayStation 4, Windows, and Xbox One versions released in May 2020. A PlayStation 5 version followed in March 2022.

Gameplay
As a return to the metroidvania style of the first three entries in the series, the game follows the half-genie Shantae as she explores an interconnected world. During her journey, Shantae encounters towns with non-player characters to interact with, as well as dungeon-style labyrinths containing new abilities to unlock and bosses to defeat. Shantae retains her ability to transform into other creatures, now utilized via an ability called "fusion magic" that allows her to instantly transform and use a creature's ability with a button press instead having to select it like in past games, functioning similarly to the Pirate Gear in Pirate's Curse. Additional special abilities can be performed by dancing, such as revealing hidden objects or healing wilted plants. Defeated enemies will sometimes drop collectible Monster Cards bearing their image. By finding a certain number of a given card, Shantae can equip it to augment her abilities, providing bonuses such as increased movement speed or magic automatically refilling over time. Up to three cards can be equipped at once, with a total of 50 different cards to collect. Like other games in the series, completing the story awards the player with bonus artwork based on their final time and completion percentage. A New Game Plus mode allows the player to replay the game with higher magic but lower defense.

A free update to the game in November 2021 added four alternate game modes: "Definitive Mode", which features more challenging rebalanced difficulty; "Beginner Mode", which lowers the difficulty such that the player cannot lose; "Full Deck Mode", which grants the player all 50 Monster Cards from the beginning of the game; and "Rule Breaker Mode", which removes the limit on how many cards can be equipped at once.

Plot
The half-genie Shantae and her friends are invited to Paradise Island by the mayor of Arena Town, where a Half-Genie Festival is being held. There, she meets and befriends fellow half-genies Plink, Vera, Zapple, Harmony, and Fillin. However, during a performance at the festival, the other half-genies are kidnapped. Determined to uncover the reason for their disappearance, Shantae begins exploring the Sunken City beneath the island in search of the other half-genies. While searching, she encounters her longtime arch-nemesis Risky Boots. Shantae accuses her of the kidnapping, but Risky refutes her, stating that she is only here to claim a mysterious treasure said to reside beneath the island, and that the others were taken by the true rulers of the island, the Seven Sirens. Shantae continues to explore beneath the island, entering four of the sirens' lairs and defeating the sirens within. She manages to rescue four of the missing half-genies, each of which transfers their magical ability to Shantae to help strengthen her against the sirens.

While rescuing Harmony, Shantae discovers that Fillin is actually her friend Rottytops. Shantae enters an underground bunker to find her, but inadvertently activates a control panel, realizing that the sunken city is both a giant airship and the treasure that Risky Boots was after. She ventures further inside and rescues Rottytops, who admits she hid in Shantae's luggage and disguised herself after Shantae didn't invite her along, while Shantae explains she only left her out because Rottytops was already hidden and she couldn't find her. As Shantae defeats the fifth siren and they escape, Risky activates the ship and takes off, preparing to activate the ship's weapons and destroy the island.

Shantae is teleported aboard the ship by the friendly sixth siren, Lobster Siren, but is imprisoned by the Mayor, revealed to have been Risky all along. The sirens' elderly leader, Empress Siren, appears and explains she was defeated by Harmony's mother years ago, who placed a spell on her so she could only feed on the life force of genies and not mortals, causing her to starve. The Empress made a deal with Risky, offering the ship in exchange for bringing her five half-genies whose life force she could use to break the spell, restoring her and allowing her to absorb mortal life force again. However, she betrays Risky and steals her life force, restoring her youth, and announces her plan to drain the life force from all creatures to make herself immortal. Shantae frees herself and defeats the Empress, who realizes her restoration was incomplete due to Rottytops not being an actual half-genie. Shantae restores the other half-genies' magic as they take back their stolen life force, destroying the Empress.

As the ship begins to crash from the damage sustained, the others evacuate while Shantae remains behind to rescue Risky Boots, carrying her back to shore. Risky admits she told the Empress Siren Shantae's magic was tainted so she wouldn't be drained, allowing her to defeat the Empress if she tried to betray Risky. As Risky departs, Shantae and the other half-genies decide to resume the festival, and Lobster Siren offers to help rebuild the island. As Shantae and her friends prepare to depart after the festival, Harmony gives her a scrapbook made by the Guardian Genies filled with messages left for their half-genie daughters, including some written by Shantae's mother.

Development
On March 25, 2019, WayForward revealed the game under the working title Shantae 5, and stated it would be released on multiple platforms, including the newly-announced Apple Arcade service, later that same year. The official title and first gameplay details were confirmed the following August. Seven Sirens features 2D hand-painted artwork designed for 4K resolution devices, along with animated cutscenes. The game's opening sequence was animated by Trigger and features an original song, "Rise and Shine Shantae", with vocals by Shantae voice actress Cristina Vee. The first part of the game was released for iOS on September 19, 2019 as a launch title of the Apple Arcade subscription service; the remainder of the game was added via an update on March 28, 2020. The Apple Arcade version later released on iPadOS and tvOS on September 30, 2019, and on macOS on October 7, 2019. The console and PC versions of the game were released on May 28, 2020. The game received four new game modes, as well as several quality of life changes, via an update to all versions on November 30, 2021. A PlayStation 5 version was released on March 22, 2022.

Reception

Shantae and the Seven Sirens received "generally favorable" reviews, according to review aggregator Metacritic.

References

External links

2019 video games
Apple Arcade games
IOS games
MacOS games
Metroidvania games
Nintendo Switch games
Platform games
PlayStation 4 games
PlayStation 5 games
PlayStation Network games
And the Seven Sirens
Video games about shapeshifting
Video games about pirates
Video games developed in the United States
Video games featuring female protagonists
Windows games
Xbox One games